Viktor Farkas (born 5 October 1987 in Pyongyang) is a Hungarian football player who currently plays for Dunaújváros PASE.

References
MLSZ

1978 births
Living people
Sportspeople from Pyongyang
Hungarian footballers
Association football defenders
MTK Budapest FC players
BKV Előre SC footballers
FC Tatabánya players
Szombathelyi Haladás footballers
Lombard-Pápa TFC footballers
Budapest Honvéd FC players
Diósgyőri VTK players
Vecsés FC footballers
Dunaújváros PASE players
Nemzeti Bajnokság I players